Aadil Sheegow Sagaar is a Somali politician. He is the State Minister for Parliamentary Relations of Somalia, having been appointed to the position on 12 January 2015 by Prime Minister Omar Abdirashid Ali Sharmarke.

References

Living people
Government ministers of Somalia
Year of birth missing (living people)